The Volta-Bani War was an anti-colonial rebellion which took place in French West Africa (specifically, the areas of modern Burkina Faso and Mali) between 1915 and 1917. It was a war between an indigenous African force drawn from a heterogeneous coalition of local peoples who rose against the French Army. At its height in 1916 the rebels mustered from 15,000–20,000 men and fought on several fronts. After about a year and several setbacks, the French army defeated the insurgents and jailed or executed their leaders but resistance continued until 1917.

The war started after the 1915 rainy season when a group of representatives from around a dozen villages gathered at Bona where they resolved to take up arms against the French occupiers. This took place in the context of World War I and introduction of conscription for the French Army. There was also widespread optimism that the colonial government could be beaten at this moment of weakness. It went through various phases as the colonial army organised two suppression campaigns but initially failed in its purpose, in the face of fierce opposition and superior tactics. The Volta-Bani War is one of the most significant armed oppositions to colonial government anywhere in Africa. It was the main reason for the creation of the colony of Haute Volta (now Burkina Faso) after World War I, by splitting off seven districts from the large colony of Haut-Sénégal and Niger.

The name "Volta-Bani War" was coined in the book West African Challenge to Empire: Culture and History in the Volta-Bani War, which is an anthropological analysis and detailed description of these confrontations, on the basis of military archives documents and an elaborate understanding of the region based on ethnographic fieldwork and oral history. The book won the Amaury Talbot Prize of the Royal Anthropological Institute for 2002. A fictional account of the revolt was the subject of one of the important early literary works of West Africa, Nazi Boni's Crépuscule des temps anciens (1962).

See also
African theatre of World War I

Footnotes

References

Further reading

External links
 Book review: West African Challenge to Empire: Culture and History in the Volta-Bani Anticolonial War: Tony Chafer
 Book review: West African Challenge to Empire: culture and history in the Volta-Bani anticolonial war: James Currey

Wars involving France
Wars involving Burkina Faso
Wars involving Mali
African resistance to colonialism
1916 in French West Africa
Conflicts in 1915
Conflicts in 1916
Conflicts in 1917
African theatre of World War I
French colonial empire and World War I
Resistance to the French colonial empire